This is a list of the 351 communes of the Gard department of France.

The communes cooperate in the following intercommunalities (as of 2020):
CA Alès Agglomération
Communauté d'agglomération du Gard Rhodanien
Communauté d'agglomération du Grand Avignon (partly)
Communauté d'agglomération Nîmes Métropole
Communauté de communes Beaucaire Terre d'Argence
Communauté de communes Causses Aigoual Cévennes
Communauté de communes des Cévennes Gangeoises et Suménoises (partly)
Communauté de communes de Cèze Cévennes (partly)
Communauté de communes Mont Lozère (partly)
Communauté de communes du Pays de Sommières
Communauté de communes Pays d'Uzès
Communauté de communes du Pays Viganais
Communauté de communes de Petite-Camargue
Communauté de communes du Piémont Cévenol
Communauté de communes du Pont du Gard
Communauté de communes Rhôny, Vistre, Vidourle
Communauté de communes Terre de Camargue

References

Gard